McClure Pass is a mountain pass in the Rocky Mountains of western Colorado in the United States. It is located along the boundary between Pitkin and Gunnison counties, in a gap at the western side of the Elk Mountains. The pass is at an elevation of ) and separates the headwaters of the Crystal River (a tributary of the Roaring Fork River) to the east with the headwaters of the North Fork Gunnison River to the west. The pass is named in honor of Thomas "Mack" McClure who in the late 19th Century owned a large house at the eastern base of the pass. The house served as a stage stop where McClure fed and lodged travelers.

The pass is traversed by State Highway 133 between Carbondale and Paonia, providing the direct route between the Roaring Fork Valley and the North Fork Valley. The pass is not especially high and is generally open year-round, closed only during heavy snowstorms. The approaches are fairly steep on each side, with an 8% grade.

References

External links 
 USGS Topozone entry

Mountain passes of Colorado
Landforms of Pitkin County, Colorado
Landforms of Gunnison County, Colorado
Transportation in Pitkin County, Colorado
Transportation in Gunnison County, Colorado